The Devil Is a Woman is a 1950 Mexican drama film directed by Tito Davison. It was entered into the 1951 Cannes Film Festival.

Cast
 María Félix - Angela
 Víctor Junco - Adrian Villanueva
 Crox Alvarado - Esteban
 José María Linares-Rivas - Lic. Octavio Sotelo Vargas
 Perla Aguiar - Angélica
 Dalia Íñiguez - Gertrudis
 Luis Beristáin - Cura
 José Baviera - Ernesto Solar Fuentes
 Beatriz Ramos - Carmela
 Nicolás Rodríguez (actor) - Pepe Luis
 Salvador Quiroz - Amante Viejo
 Alejandro Cobo - El Cojo
 Juan Orraca - Policia
 Isabel del Puerto - Clara
 Carlos Múzquiz - Martínez, de la casa de juegos

References

External links

1950 films
1950s Spanish-language films
1950 drama films
Mexican black-and-white films
Films directed by Tito Davison
Mexican drama films
1950s Mexican films